"My Give a Damn's Busted" is a song written by American country music artist Joe Diffie along with Tom Shapiro and Tony Martin.  Diffie originally recorded the song on his 2001 album In Another World. The song was later recorded by Jo Dee Messina on her album Delicious Surprise. Released on January 3, 2005, Messina's version spent two weeks at the top of the Billboard Hot Country Songs charts that year, and her first chart single since "I Wish" in late 2003 – early 2004. Canadian country music singer Michelle Wright included her version of the song on her 2006 album Everything and More.

Music video
A music video was released for the song, directed by Peter Zavadil. The main performance takes place in the middle of a big city street, with Messina performing with her band behind her. Also included, are scenes of her walking down a sidewalk while being followed by a persistent man, to whom she directs the spoken lines of the song. Other scenes feature her in an alleyway alone singing, and in a room with a huge glass mirror. During the parts of the song where the male's parents and therapist are mentioned, Messina is also seen with the man in both situations. It was filmed on 2 very cold days in February 2005, in downtown Los Angeles, CA.

Personnel
Compiled from liner notes.

 Mike Brignardello – bass guitar
 Tom Bukovac – electric guitar
 Lisa Cochran – background vocals
 Stuart Duncan – fiddle
 Shannon Forrest – drums
 Paul Franklin – Dobro, slide guitar
 Wes Hightower – background vocals
 Jo Dee Messina – lead vocals
 Jimmy Nichols – organ
 Bryan Sutton – acoustic guitar

Chart performance

Year-end charts

References

2005 singles
Jo Dee Messina songs
Joe Diffie songs
Michelle Wright songs
Songs written by Tom Shapiro
Songs written by Joe Diffie
Songs written by Tony Martin (songwriter)
Song recordings produced by Byron Gallimore
Music videos directed by Peter Zavadil
Curb Records singles
2001 songs